Hillsburn is an indie pop band from Halifax, Nova Scotia, Canada. They have been hailed by several media outlets as one of the east coast of Canada's next big acts and were recently included on CBC's list of '21 Canadian albums we can't wait to hear in 2021'. Hillsburn have released three full-length studio albums, and have won or been nominated for a number of regional and national awards. Their latest record, Slipping Away, was released on May 28, 2021. Slipping Away was produced by Howard Redekopp, who has worked with other notable Canadian acts, including Tegan and Sara, The New Pornographers, and Mother Mother.

Musical career
The band was formed as a quartet in 2014 at the home of band member Paul Aarntzen, who was residing in the small village of Hillsburn, Nova Scotia at the time. Rosanna Burrill and her brother Clayton were joined by Jackson Fairfax-Perry at Paul's home where the band had its first rehearsals. Aarntzen subsequently relocated to Halifax to dedicate more time to the project. Hillsburn released its self-titled, self-recorded EP in October 2014. One of the tracks from this self-recorded EP placed in the national top ten in CBC's Searchlight competition that year.

This success was followed up with the release of the band's first full-length album, In The Battle Years in 2016. Shortly after releasing their debut full-length the band added drummer Clare Macdonald to the mix. Clare, Rosanna, and Jackson had all previously known each other from Dalhousie University's Music program.

In The Battle Years was awarded the 2016 Canadian Folk Music Award for New/Emerging Artist of the Year. Hillsburn was also nominated in several categories at the 2017 East Coast Music Awards, including Rising Star Recording of the Year, Group Recording of the Year, and Fans' Choice Video of the Year. The band won the 2017 ECMA for Fans' Choice Video, beating out high-profile acts such as Classified, Ria Mae, Ben Caplan, Paper Lions, and Heather Rankin.

Hillsburn has toured extensively across North America.

Hillsburn released its sophomore record, The Wilder Beyond, on February 2, 2018. The album was nominated for six awards at the 2018 Nova Scotia Music Awards—including Group Recording of the Year, Recording of the Year, and Pop Recording of the Year—while Aarntzen was nominated for SOCAN songwriter of the year. Hillsburn also received four nominations for the 2019 East Coast Music Awards, including Group Recording of the Year and Fans' Choice Entertainer of the Year. The Wilder Beyond has charted extensively on the Earshot national campus and community radio charts in Canada. A deluxe edition of the album was released in February 2019.

The band announced in January 2020 that it was working on a new album with producer Howard Redekopp.

Paul Aarntzen left Hillsburn in 2020 after the band finished work on its third album, Slipping Away.

Hillsburn released a first single from Slipping Away, 'Waking Up,' in October 2020. 'Husha' and 'Get High' followed in February and March 2021.

The band and Slipping Away led the field of nominees at the 2022 East Coast Music Awards, with a total of six nominations, including for Album of the Year. Paul Aarntzen was nominated for both Songwriter and Song of the Year for his work on the album.

Band members

Rosanna Burrill - Vocals, bass, guitar, violin
Clayton Burrill - Vocals, guitar, synthesizers
Jackson Fairfax-Perry - Keyboards, synthesizers
Clare Macdonald - Drums, percussion, vocals

Discography
Hillsburn EP - 2015
In the Battle Years - 2016
The Wilder Beyond - 2018
The Wilder Beyond (Deluxe Edition) - 2019
Slipping Away - 2021 [forthcoming]

Documentary 
Hillsburn: A Band Becomes (2016)

Awards and nominations

References

External links
 Official website

Musical groups established in 2014
Musical groups from Halifax, Nova Scotia
Canadian folk rock groups
Canadian Folk Music Award winners
2014 establishments in Nova Scotia